Pallai railway station ( Paḷai toṭaruntu nilaiyam) is a railway station in the town of Pallai in northern Sri Lanka. Owned by Sri Lanka Railways, the state-owned railway operator, the station is part of the Northern Line which links the north with the capital Colombo. The popular Yarl Devi service calls at the station. The station was not functioning between 1990 and 2014 due to the civil war. The Northern Line between Kilinochchi and Pallai was re-opened on 4 March 2014.

References

Railway stations in Kilinochchi District
Railway stations on the Northern Line (Sri Lanka)